The Goksøyr Mires Nature Reserve is located on the island of Runde in the municipality of Herøy in Møre og Romsdal county, Norway. The reserve was established in 1996 to "take care of a bog area with a blanket bog, a bog type and bog vegetation that were common in coastal areas, but which, due to various forms of intervention, are now rarely found in good and typical condition," according to the conservation regulations.

The nature reserve encompasses the northwestern part of a mountain plateau on Runde. Blanket bog dominates the area, which has slopes as steep as 25°. The bog is a nesting area for the great skua.

In 2013, the area was designated a Ramsar wetland site as one of five subareas of the Runde Ramsar Site.

References

External links
 Mijlø-direktoratet: Goksøyrmyrane. Map and description of the nature reserve.
 Miljøverndepartementet. 1996. Goksøyrmyrane naturreservat, Herøy kommune, Møre og Romsdal fylke. 1:5,000 map of the nature reserve.
 Runde Bird Sanctuary. 2010. County Governor of Møre and Romsdal.

Nature reserves in Norway
Protected areas of Møre og Romsdal
Herøy, Møre og Romsdal
Protected areas established in 1996